Gaozhuang Subdistrict  is a subdistrict located in Shilong District, Pingdingshan, Henan, China.

References

Township-level divisions of Henan
Shilong District